Bhaage Re Mann is an Indian soap opera which aired on Zindagi from 30 November 2015 to 25 July 2016. It was first original soap of Zindagi. 

The story revolves around Padmini (Karuna Pandey).

Plot 
It's the story of a woman Padmini(Karuna Pandey) who had kept herself from getting tied down to societal norms and stereotypes for 39 years. She has to now rise to the occasion and don a role she has kept away from.

Summary
Bhaage Re Mann is the coming of age of a 40-year-old woman, Padmini. Padmini, at the age of 19, ran away from her family, marriage and responsibility, being a commitment-phobic woman.

Now, 20 years later, her best friend (also her Bhabhi), calls her for the wedding of her youngest daughter, Anvita.
With trepidation, she steps back to her childhood home and town. Only to be faced with the wrath of her elder brother who still holds a grudge at the way she left. TO his support, is her one-time bestie and now the support to her family, Raghav Vajpayee or RU uncle as her millennial nieces and nephew call him.

In this setup of marriage, Padmini meets her 2 nieces Jyoti and Anvita(the bride to be) and her nephew Ishaan. She sees them for the first time as grown-up people. They are amazed to see her, their own aunty, Mini B (as she insists on being called). She is everything they have been told not to be. She is quirky, cool and extremely vocal. With her lateral thinking and one-liners, for them, she is a riot. 
Padmini fits into the house like a glove. But then, as she is preparing to leave, a tragedy strikes. She is the only adult around with these 3 kids left anchorless.

She has to rise to the occasion to become a mother to them. All she has is her quirky attitude and out of the box thinking. Not the ideal stuff that a parent is supposed to possess. She now has to rise to the occasion to commit herself to this rudderless family and this is how she comes of age. While she is handling her family, the kids see that there is some chemistry and history between her and Raghav. How they all get together to get the two of them back together makes the rest of the story.

Broadcast 
The first season of Bhaage Re Mann was broadcast on Zindagi from 30 November 2015 to 19 March 2016.  Season 2 was broadcast on the same channel from 23 June 2016 to 25 July 2016.

Seasons

Cast and Characters 

 Karuna Pandey as Padmini (Ashok Awasthi's Sister)
 Chandan Anand as Raghav (Ashok Awasthi's Neighbour)
 Kanika Shivpuri as Maa (Raghav's Mother)
 Ved Thapar as Ashok Awasthi
 Nupur Alankar as Mrs Anjali Awasthi (Ashok Awasthi's Wife)
 Tarun Mehta as Ishaan Awasthi (Ashok and Anjali's Son)
 Priya Marathe as Sneha Awasthi (Ishaan's Wife)
 Vasundhara Kaul as Jyoti (Ashok and Anjali's Daughter)
 Ankit Narang as Ashutosh (Jyoti's Husband)
 Arshima Thapar as Anvita Awasthi (Ashok and Anjali's Daughter)
 Nishad Vaidya as Rohit (Anvita's Husband)
 Aamir Dalvi as Rudra (Padmini's tracking friend) 
 Manasi Salvi as Riya Bajpai (Raghav's wife) 
 Gautam Saugat as Maali Kaka 
 Sarang Patwardhan as Jojo

References 

Zee Zindagi original programming
2015 Indian television series debuts
Indian television soap operas
2016 Indian television series endings